Phnom Nam Lyr Wildlife Sanctuary is a large protected area in Mondulkiri Province, Cambodia, established in 1993. It is close to Village I, Bou Sra Commune near the Pech Chreada District bordering Vietnam.

It is threatened by illegal logging.

References

External links 
 Map of protected areas in Cambodia

Geography of Mondulkiri province
Wildlife sanctuaries of Cambodia
Protected areas of Cambodia
Protected areas established in 1993